The "Gibraltar Anthem" is the national song of the British overseas territory of Gibraltar.

In common with the United Kingdom, Crown dependencies and other British territories, the official national anthem of Gibraltar is "God Save the King". The Gibraltar anthem is the national song, and was chosen in a competition in 1994. Both the lyrics and music were composed by Peter Emberley, who is not a Gibraltarian.

The anthem is sung every 10 September by the general public at the annual release of red and white ticker paper on Gibraltar National Day.  Balloons used to be released, but this was stopped following concerns about the impact on the environment.

See also
 Llévame Donde Nací
 Bardengesang auf Gibraltar: O Calpe! Dir donnert's am Fuße

External links
Midi arrangement

Anthem, Gibraltar
British anthems
Gibraltarian patriotic songs
1994 songs
European anthems